Røen is a Norwegian surname. Notable people with the surname include:

John Røen (1903–1979), Norwegian cross-country skier
Sigurd Røen (1909–1992), Norwegian nordic skier

See also
Roen (surname)

Norwegian-language surnames